Prospekt Mira is a station on the Kaluzhsko–Rizhskaya line of the Moscow Metro. It was designed by V. Lebedev and P. Shteller and opened on 1 May 1958. The station features flared pylons faced with white marble and trimmed with sharp-edged metal cornices. The walls are faced with off-white ceramic tile with horizontal black stripes.

Between 1958 and until 1971 the station was the southern terminus of the Rizhskaya line.

The entrance to the station is located on the west side of Prospekt Mira (north of Protopopovsky Pereulok) in the ground floor of the Metro's central control building.

Transfers
From this station it is possible to transfer to Prospekt Mira on the Koltsevaya line.

Moscow Metro stations
Railway stations in Russia opened in 1958
Kaluzhsko-Rizhskaya Line
Railway stations located underground in Russia